Long-chain-fatty-acid—CoA ligase 1 is an enzyme that in humans is encoded by the ACSL1 gene.

Structure

Gene

The ACSL1 gene is located on the 4th chromosome, with its specific location being 4q35.1. The gene contains 28 exons. 
               
The protein encoded by this gene is an isozyme of the long-chain fatty-acid-coenzyme A ligase family. Although differing in substrate specificity, subcellular localization, and tissue distribution, all isozymes of this family convert free long-chain fatty acids into fatty acyl-CoA esters, and thereby play a key role in lipid biosynthesis and fatty acid degradation.

In melanocytic cells ACSL1 gene expression may be regulated by MITF.

Function

The protein encoded by this gene is an isozyme of the long-chain fatty-acid-coenzyme A ligase family. Although differing in substrate specificity, subcellular localization, and tissue distribution, all isozymes of this family convert free long-chain fatty acids into fatty acyl-CoA esters, and thereby play a key role in lipid biosynthesis and fatty acid degradation.  Several transcript variants encoding different isoforms have been found for this gene. This specific protein is most commonly found in mitochondria and peroxisomes.

Clinical significance

ACSL1 is known to be involved in fatty-acid metabolism critical for heart function  and nonspecific mental retardation. Since the ACSL4 gene is highly expressed in brain, where it encodes a brain specific isoform, an ASCL1 mutation may be an efficient diagnostic tool in mentally retarded males.

Interactions

ACSL1 expression is regulated by SHP2 activity. Additionally, ACSL4 interacts with ACSL3, APP, DSE, ELAVL1, HECW2, MINOS1, PARK2, SPG20, SUMO2, TP53, TUBGCP3, UBC, UBD, and YWHAQ.

References

Further reading

External links
 

Human proteins